Norman Chappell (31 December 1925, Lucknow, India – 21 July 1983) was an English character actor, known for numerous roles in television and film.

Biography
Born in India, during the British Raj Chappell appeared mainly in television series as a character actor, usually in light comedy roles. He was best known for his roles in the Carry On films and in The Avengers. He often portrayed slightly pompous types of which his role in "The Gilded Cage" was a good example. He also appeared in a number of comedy sketches performed in the early 3-2-1 TV shows hosted by "Ted Rogers".

Selected filmography
 The Day the Earth Caught Fire (1961) – Hotel receptionist (uncredited)
 Petticoat Pirates (1961) – Johnson
 The Pot Carriers (1962) – Prisoner Robert
 Jigsaw (1962) – Andy Roach
 The Punch and Judy Man (1963) – Footman
 Carry On Cabby (1963) – Allbright
 80,000 Suspects (1963) – Welford (uncredited)
 Girl in the Headlines (1963) – Police photographer
 Comedy Workshop: Love and Maud Carver (1964) – Shoe salesman
 The Beauty Jungle (1964) – Talk of the Town stage manager (uncredited)
 Crooks in Cloisters (1964) – Benson
 Doctor in Clover (1966) – Flower delivery man (uncredited)
 How I Won the War (1967) – Soldier at Alamein
 The Mini-Affair (1967) – Theatre manager
 Journey to Midnight (1968) – Friar Tuck (episode 'Poor Butterfly')
 Toomorrow (1970) – Stage door keeper (uncredited)
 Carry On Loving (1970) – Mr. Thrush (scenes deleted)
 Carry On Henry (1971) – First plotter
 The Magnificent Six and 1/2: Up the Creek (1971)
 Au Pair Girls (1972) – Salesman
 Nearest and Dearest (1972) – Man on bus
 Some Mothers Do 'Ave 'Em (1973/1978) Crossing the Road and Phoning the Doctor/Wendy House – Mr. Faraday/Cyril
 Love Thy Neighbour (1973) – Indian conductor
 Percy's Progress (1974) – Valet (uncredited)
 The Four Musketeers (1974) – Submarine inventor
 Intimate Games (1976) – Principal
 Dangerous Davies – The Last Detective (TVM, 1980) - Parsons

References

External links
 

1925 births
1985 deaths
English male film actors
English male television actors
20th-century English male actors
British people in colonial India